The red fox is a small dog-like animal.

Red Fox or Redfox may refer to:

Arts and entertainment
 Redfox (comics), a late 1980s British comicbook series
 Red Fox, a 1979 crime novel by Gerald Seymour
Red Fox (film), a 1991 British two-part television-film adaptation
 Red Fox and His Canoe, a 1964 children's reader by Nathaniel Benchley

Businesses
 RedFox, a Belizean utility software company
 Red Fox, an American children's literature imprint of Random House
 Red Fox, a Russian outdoor equipment company

People
 Chief Red Fox (1870–1976), American Lakota Sioux activist and actor
 Redd Foxx (1922–1991), American comedian and actor
 Emmett McLemore (1899–1973), American football player
 Michael Sinclair (British Army officer) (1918–1944), prisoner of war in WWII
 Norm Smith (1915–1973), Australian-rules football player and coach
 Campbell of Glenure, victim of the Appin Murder in the Scottish Highlands

Places
 Redfox, Knott County, Kentucky, United States
 Peak of the Red Fox, on Skye, the Scottish Hebrides

Other uses
 RedFox, the children's wing of the Workers' Party of Belgium
 Marist Red Foxes, American athletic teams of Marist College, New York